Abū al-Qāsim Muḥammad ibn ʿAbd Allāh (– 17 May 946), better known by his regnal name al-Qāʾim or al-Qāʾim bi-Amr Allāh was the second Caliph of the Fatimid dynasty, ruling in Ifriqiya from 934 to 946. He was the 12th Isma'ili Imam, succeeding his father Abd Allah al-Mahdi Billah.

Early life

Origin 
The future al-Qa'im was born in the Syrian town of Salamiyah in March or April 893. His birth name was Abd al-Rahman. His father was Sa'id ibn al-Husayn, the future Caliph Abd Allah al-Mahdi Billah, and is mother was Sa'id's paternal cousin, whose name is unknown. But sometime before 899, Sa'id began claiming that he was the hidden imam, descended from a line of hidden imams; and that Muhammad ibn Isma'il was only a fiction and a cover name to mask their activities. These claims caused a schism in the Isma'ili movement in 899, between those who recognized Sa'id's claims to the imamate and those who rejected them. The latter are generally known by the term "Qarmatians".

Flight to Sijilmasa 
After Sa'id's revelation that he was the hidden imam, some of his most fervent followers launched a series of Bedouin uprisings in Syria against the Abbasid Caliphate. Sa'id had not been consulted beforehand, and the outbreak of these revolts put him in danger, as his identity and location now became known to the Abbasid government, which launched a manhunt against him. Sa'id took Abd al-Rahman and a few other close members of his household, and left Salamiyah for Ramla in Palestine. There the local governor, secretly an Isma'ili convert, hid them from the Abbasid pursuit. The Bedouin rebels, calling themselves 'Fatimids', seized control of much of Syria and established a Shi'a regime, but despite receiving several letters urging him to join them , Abd al-Rahman's father remained in hiding at Ramla. The rebels were finally defeated in November 903 by the Abbasid army, and their leader captured and interrogated. 

This once again forced Sa'id to move to Fustat in Egypt, then ruled by the autonomous Tulunid dynasty. The group stayed there until January 905, when the Abbasids invaded the country and overthrew the Tulunid regime. Abd al-Rahman's father decided to move to the Maghreb, in the western fringes of the Muslim world, where one of his agents, the  Abu Abdallah al-Shi'i, had converted the Kutama Berbers to the Isma'ili cause, and by 905 had achieved some first victories against the autonomous Aghlabid dynasty that ruled Ifriqiya (modern Tunisia and eastern Algeria) under nominal Abbasid suzerainty. On the journey west, it became apparent that the Aghlabids had been informed about the group's identity and appearance, when one of their members, Abu Abdallah's brother Abu'l-Abbas Muhammad, was arrested. As a result, they skirted the Aghlabid territory along its southern borders and made for the oasis town of Sijilmasa in what is now eastern Morocco. Sa'id, Abd al-Rahman, and their small entourage settled in Sijilmasa, leading the comfortable life of wealthy merchants, for the next four years.

Crown prince and general 
In March 909, the Kutama under Abu Abdallah al-Shi'i finally defeated the last Aghlabid army, forcing Emir Ziyadat Allah III into exile and capturing the capital of Ifriqiya, Kairouan, and the nearby Aghlabid palace city of Raqqada.

After his father Abd Allah al-Mahdi Billah (910-934) seized power in Ifriqiya he was named heir to the throne in 912, and helped put down several revolts. However, campaigns into Egypt (in 914–915 and 919–921) faltered against the resistance of the Abbasid Caliphate, with heavy casualties.

Reign
In 934 Al-Qa'im succeeded his father as Caliph, after which he never again left the royal residence at Mahdia. Nevertheless, the Fatimid realm became an important power in the Mediterranean. After the re-conquest of Sicily the Byzantine province of Calabria and the Ligurian coast was plundered and the city of Genoa sacked.

From 944 to 947 the realm was plunged into crisis by the revolt of Abu Yazid, who had united the Kharijite Berber tribes of the Aurès Mountains of eastern Algeria and overrun Ifriqiya. Imam Al-Qa'im was able to hold out in Mahdia with the help of the navy for over a year, but died (13th Shawwal 334 AH (Mahdiyya)/17 May 946) before the revolt could be put down.

He was succeeded by his son Ismail al-Mansur (r. 946–953).

Family
He was married already at an early age, before his family left Salamiya. His wife, Umm Habiba, apparently was still a child when she accompanied him to the Maghreb. He also had six known concubines, of which one, Karima, became the mother of his successor al-Mansur.

See also

 List of Ismaili imams
 Ali ibn Muhammad al-Iyadi

References

Sources
 
 
 
 
 

893 births
946 deaths
10th-century Fatimid caliphs
Syrian Ismailis
Sons of Fatimid caliphs